Globomyces is a genus of fungi belonging to the family Globomycetaceae.

The species of this genus are found in Europe.

Species:
 Globomyces pollinis-pini (A.Braun) Letcher

References

Chytridiomycota
Chytridiomycota genera